Amalapuram Assembly constituency is an SC reserved constituency in Konaseema district of Andhra Pradesh, representing the state legislative assembly in India. It is one of the seven assembly segments of Amalapuram Lok Sabha constituency, along with Ramachandrapuram, Mummidivaram, Razole, Gannavaram, Kothapeta, and Mandapeta. Viswarupu Pinipe is the present MLA of the constituency, who won the 2019 Andhra Pradesh Legislative Assembly election from YSR Congress Party. , there are a total of 229,431 electors in the constituency.

Before formation of Andhra state in 1953, this constituency was part of Madras presidency and had two seats; one for general and other one reserved.

Mandals 

The three mandals that form the assembly constituency are:

Members of Legislative Assembly Amalapuram

Legend

Key
  Resigned
  Assassinated or died in office
  By-poll
  Returned to office after a previous non-consecutive term

As part of Madras Presidency (until 1953)

As part of Andhra State (1953-1956)

As part of Andhra Pradesh (since 1956)

Election results

Assembly elections 1952

Assembly Elections 1955 
(Two seats: One reserved for general and other one for SC.)

Assembly Elections 1962

Assembly Elections 1965 (by-polls)

Assembly Elections 1967

Assembly Elections 1972

Assembly Elections 1983

Assembly Elections 1985

Assembly Elections 1989

Assembly Elections 1994

Assembly Elections 1999

Assembly Elections 2004

Assembly Elections 2009

Assembly elections 2014

Assembly Elections 2019

See also 
 List of constituencies of the Andhra Pradesh Legislative Assembly

References

Notes

Assembly constituencies of Andhra Pradesh